Sphaerozetes is a genus of mites belonging to the family Ceratozetidae.

The species of this genus are found in Europe and Northern America.

Species:
 Oribates convexulus (Koch & Berendt, 1854) 
 Sphaerozetes affinis (Trägårdh, 1907)

References

Acari
Acari genera